The 1993 Volvo PGA Championship was the 39th edition of the Volvo PGA Championship, an annual professional golf tournament on the European Tour. It was held 28–31 May at the West Course of Wentworth Club in Virginia Water, Surrey, England, a suburb southwest of London.

Bernhard Langer won his second Volvo PGA Championship with a final-round 68, beating the chasing pack by six shots.

Round summaries

First round 
Friday, 28 May 1993

Second round 
Saturday, 29 May 1993

Third round 
Sunday, 30 May 1993

Final round 
Monday, 31 May 1993

References 

BMW PGA Championship
Golf tournaments in England
Volvo PGA Championship
Volvo PGA Championship
Volvo PGA Championship